Alysicarpus bupleurifolius, the sweet alys, is a perennial herb in the legume family Fabaceae, native to tropical Asia.

Distribution and habitat
Alysicarpus bupleurifolius is native to an area from Pakistan east to Taiwan and south to New Guinea. Its habitat is in forests, shrubland and inland wetlands.

References

bupleurifolius
Flora of tropical Asia
Plants described in 1753
Taxa named by Carl Linnaeus